Jarrod Brander is a professional Australian rules footballer for the Greater Western Sydney Giants, having been initially drafted to the West Coast Eagles. Brander made his debut in round 13, 2018 against the Sydney Swans at the SCG.

Early life
Originally from Mildura in Victoria, he participated in the Auskick program at Wentworth District in New South Wales.

Brander was part of the GWS Giants Academy as a teenager. He was ruled ineligible to join the Giants as an academy selection because the academy's zones were scaled back. Brander stated he was content with the decision. He played cricket for Geelong Grammar and football for the Bendigo Pioneers.

AFL Career
Brander was drafted by West Coast with pick 13 in the 2017 national draft and wore number 10. He played in a practice match against Fremantle at Lathlain Park, earning praise from The West Australian's chief football writer Mark Duffield. Brander was touted as a successor to key forward Josh Kennedy. 

After only one season at the Giants, Brander was delisted on September 23rd 2022.

References

External links

Living people
1999 births
West Coast Eagles players
Australian rules footballers from Victoria (Australia)
Bendigo Pioneers players
People from Mildura
West Coast Eagles (WAFL) players
East Perth Football Club players